Megalosauripus is an ichnogenus that has been attributed to dinosaurs.

See also
 List of dinosaur ichnogenera
 Ichnology

References

Dinosaur trace fossils